Batley and Spen by-election may refer to two by-elections in the UK:

2016 Batley and Spen by-election following the murder of Jo Cox
2021 Batley and Spen by-election following the resignation of Tracy Brabin